Pachylia is a genus of moths in the family Sphingidae. The genus was erected by Francis Walker in 1856.

Species
Pachylia darceta H. Druce, 1881
Pachylia ficus (Linnaeus, 1758)
Pachylia syces (Hübner, 1819)

References

Dilophonotini
Sphingidae of South America
Moths of South America
Moth genera
Taxa named by Francis Walker (entomologist)